Hazrat, or  (pl.  ḥaḍrāt; Persian: pronounced  or ) is a common Bangladeshi, Indian, Pakistani, Iranian, Afghan, and honorific Arabic and Turkish title used to honour a person. It literally denotes and translates to "presence, appearance."

Usage 
Initially, the title was used for the prophets of the Islamic faith: the twenty-five great Hadhrats include Muhammad, Abraham, Noah, Moses, and Jesus. It carries connotations of the charismatic and is comparable to traditional Western honorifics addressing high officials, such as "Your Honour" (for judges), "Your Majesty" (for monarchs), or "Your Holiness" (for clerics). This word may sometimes also appear after the names of respected Muslim personalities, such as imams, sheikhs, and ulama e.g. Turkish  ('his Hadrat') in Islamic culture.

References 

Titles
Islamic honorifics